Crenicichla pydanielae is a species of cichlid native to South America. It is found in the Amazon River basin and in the Trombetas River drainage above Cachoeira Porteira, Brazil.

The fish is named in honor of Lúcia H. Rapp Py-Daniel, the Curator of Fishes at the Instituto Nacional de Pesquisas da Amazônia, for her hospitality when Ploeg visited Manaus in November 1987 and July 1989.

References

Ploeg, A., 1991. Revision of the South American cichlid genus Crenicichla Heckel, 1840, with description of fifteen new species and consideration on species groups, phylogeny and biogeography (Pisces, Perciformes, Cichlidae). Univ. Amsterdam, Netherlands,153 p. Ph.D. dissertation.

pydanielae
Freshwater fish of Brazil
Fish of the Amazon basin
Taxa named by Alex Ploeg
Fish described in 1991